The Kingdoms of Kalamar is a fantasy role-playing game campaign setting created by Kenzer and Company, originally released in 1994. In 2000, shortly after Wizards of the Coast announced the 3rd edition of Dungeons & Dragons, Wizards and Kenzer jointly announced that Kenzer had acquired a rights to produce the Kalamar setting as a Dungeons & Dragons official licensed product.

The setting has a loyal following and has received praise for its consistency and realism. Kenzer and Company has also made the Kingdoms of Kalamar the official setting of its own role-playing fantasy game, HackMaster.

History

1990s
The original The Kingdoms of Kalamar material was clearly intended for use with Dungeons & Dragons, while carefully avoiding any direct trademark or copyright infringement. The setting appeared in two books, "Kingdoms of Kalamar, Vol 1: Sourcebook of the Sovereign Lands", and "Vol 2: Mythos of the Divine and Worldly", both in 1994. While distribution was not widespread, fans of the setting continued to support it.

Vol 1: Sourcebook of the Sovereign Lands detailed the people and places of Tellene, the campaign's continent (and world). It broke the continent down into six regions and examined each one on a large scale.

Vol 2: Mythos of the Divine and Worldly detailed the setting's 43 gods. It also described the setting's secret societies, astrology and calendar.

These products were available individually or together in a box set with a two-part map.

Dungeons & Dragons 3rd edition

On November 1, 2000, Wizards of the Coast announced via press release that Kingdoms of Kalamar would become an official Dungeons & Dragons world.

The Sourcebook of the Sovereign Lands and the Mythos of the Divine and Worldly were combined with nearly 100,000 words of new material for the Kingdoms of Kalamar Campaign Setting, which was nominated for the Origins Award for Best Roleplaying Game in 2001. Over 30 different products have been released to support it.

The reviewer from Pyramid found that while the Kingdoms of Kalamar originally had numerous game stats relating to 2nd edition Dungeons & Dragons, once the Kingdoms were made an official Dungeons & Dragons setting in third edition, it had very few D&D specific references.

While most of the books have been released with the Dungeons & Dragons logo, newer books (starting with Svimohzia: the Ancient Isle) and pdf re-releases have been without it. On July 11, 2007, Kenzer & Company announced that their license with Wizards of the Coast would expire in August of that year.

Hackmaster 

On July 6, 2006, Kenzer & Company announced that Kingdoms of Kalamar would be the official setting of the second version of their HackMaster roleplaying game.

Dungeons and Dragons 4th edition 
On July 8, 2008, Kenzer & Company released a compilation of the Campaign Setting and Atlas as a new PDF updated to Dungeons & Dragons 4th edition. Notable about this release was that it did not use the Game System License and was the first 3rd-party release compatible with 4th edition not under the GSL.

Setting 
The continent of Tellene is the focus of the Kingdoms of Kalamar setting. Inhabitants of Tellene believe it the entirety of the world, although the source-material hint at lands beyond the edges of the map. Due to this, the world is also generally referred to as Tellene.

Tellene is generally divided into several subregions. These include Brandobia, the Young Kingdoms, the Wild Lands, Reanaaria Bay and the isle of Svimohzia. The southernmost tip of Tellene lies at roughly 20° latitude, while the northernmost explored areas rest at about 54° latitude. The climate ranges from temperate to sub-tropical.

Tellene has three moons; Diadolai, Pelselond and Veshemo. These orbit Tellene with an 80, 34 and 28 day Orbital period respectively. Most of Tellene uses a lunar calendar, based around the 28-day orbit of Veshemo. The year consists of 13 months, each divided into four 7-day weeks. The year starts on the first day of spring.

External links
Kenzer & Company
TSR Archive Kingdoms of Kalamar product list
Review in Shadis

References

Dungeons & Dragons campaign settings